Days of Sadat is a 2001 Egyptian biographical film about the third President of Egypt Anwar Al Sadat. The film features Ahmad Zaki as the Egyptian president. Cast includes Mervat Amin, Mona Zaki and Ahmed El Sakka. The film captured intimate details about the president in great accuracy. One notable characteristic of Sadat was his speech pattern, which Ahmad Zaki captured strongly in his performance.

Cast
 Ahmad Zaki as President Anwar Sadat
 Mona Zaki as the young Jehan Al Sadat
 Mervat Amin as First Lady Jehan Al Sadat
 Ahmed El Sakka as Atef El Sadat, the president's brother
 Mohamed El Kholi as President Gamal Abdel Nasser

Reception
When the movie was released in 2001, it attracted a huge following in Egypt, ranking as one of Egypt's highest-grossing movies. This was Zaki's second biographical movie, following Nasser 56.

Director Mohamed Khan received high praise for his directing of the movie. However, some critics claimed that the movie was a bit too biased, since it only focused on the writings of Sadat himself from his book, In Search of an Identity.

External links 
 

 Ayyam Saddat  at ShooFeeTV

2001 films
2000s biographical films
Egyptian biographical films
2000s Arabic-language films
Political drama films
Films directed by Mohamed Khan
Works about Anwar Sadat
Cultural depictions of Anwar Sadat
Cultural depictions of Gamal Abdel Nasser
Egyptian historical films